Gustav Adolf Deissmann (7 November 1866 – 5 April 1937) was a German Protestant theologian, best known for his leading work on the Greek language used in the New Testament, which he showed was the koine, or commonly used tongue of the Hellenistic world of that time.

Life

Deissmann was professor of theology at the Ruprecht Karl University of Heidelberg (1897–1908), and then at the Friedrich Wilhelms University of Berlin (1908–1935). He was twice nominated for the Nobel Peace Prize, and held eight honorary doctorates from 6 different countries.

In 1904 he founded, together with Albrecht Dieterich, the Eranos circle in Heidelberg. Members included Ernst Troeltsch, Max Weber, Eberhard Gothein, Georg Jellinek, Karl Rathgen, and Wilhelm Windelband.

In Berlin, Deissmann's academic focus began to shift from Greek philology to the ecumenical movement, church reform and, significantly, international Völkerverständigung (i.e. peace-promoting mutual understanding between nations and cultures). From 1914 until 1922 he produced a regular semi-political international communiqué, the Evangelischer Wochenbrief (1914–1921), with its English equivalent Protestant Weekly Letters (1914–1917). Its target audience was primarily influential German and American Christians, and it provided a forum for the advancement of peace and understanding among nations.

In 1925 Deissmann became aware of the disintegration of ancient Ephesus, a historically important archaeological site, partly excavated before World War I under the auspices of the Austrian Archaeological Institute. Deissmann campaigned single-handedly for several years, both on a national and international level, to raise awareness of the plight of Ephesus, and managed to organise funding for the archaeological work to recommence in 1926, and continued annually until 1929.

Deissmann died on 5 April 1937, in Wünsdorf near Berlin, where he is buried in the local cemetery.

Selected works by Deissmann

See also
 Tiberius Julius Abdes Pantera

Notes

Further reading

 A. Gerber, 'Protestantism and Social Liberalism in Imperial Germany: Gustav Adolf Deissmann (1866–1937) and Friedrich Naumann (1860–1919)', in Australian Journal of Politics and History, vol. 57, nr. 2, 2011, pp. 174–187.
 C. Markschies, ‘Adolf Deißmann – ein Heidelberger Pionier der Ökumene’, in Zeitschrift für neuere Theologiegeschichte, 12, 2005, pp. 47–88.
 C. Markschies, ‘Adolf Deißmann. Ein Pionier der Ökumene’, in C. Möller, et al., eds., Wegbereiter der Ökumene im 20. Jahrhundert, Göttingen, 2005, pp. 32–53.
 C. Nottmeier, ‘Ein unbekannter Brief Max Webers an Adolf Deißmann’, in Mitteilungen der Ernst-Troeltsch-Gesellschaft, vol. 13, Augsburg, 2000, pp. 99–131.
 C. Nottmeier, ‘Hermann Cohen und Adolf Deißmann: Dokumente aus dem Nachlaß Adolf Deißmanns’, in Zeitschrift für neuere Theologiegeschichte, 9, 2002, pp. 302–25.
 G. Harder / G/ Deissmann, Zum Gedenken an Adolf Deissmann. Vortrag anläßlich des 100. Geburtstages von Adolf Deissmann am 7. November 1966, gehalten am 26. April 1967 vor den Dozenten und Studenten der Kirchlichen Hochschule in Berlin, Bremen, 1967.

External links

Gustav Adolf Deissmann Protestant Weekly letter, 1914-1916 at Pitts Theology Library, Candler School of Theology

On Deissmann's linguistic ideas by James Hope Moulton, 1914
Schaff-Herzog article, Hellenistic Greek by Deissmann
 

1866 births
1937 deaths
People from Rhein-Lahn-Kreis
People from Hesse-Nassau
20th-century German Protestant theologians
National-Social Association politicians
German biblical scholars
New Testament scholars
Scholars of Koine Greek
University of Tübingen alumni
Humboldt University of Berlin alumni
Academic staff of the University of Marburg
Academic staff of Heidelberg University
Academic staff of the Humboldt University of Berlin
German male non-fiction writers
German papyrologists
Archaeologists from Rhineland-Palatinate